Stellaland Commando was a light infantry regiment of the South African Army. It formed part of the South African Army Infantry Formation as well as the South African Territorial Reserve.

History

Origins
Stellaland Commando can trace its origins back to the declaration of the state of Stellaland.

Operations

With the Zuid Afrikaanse Republiek
The Stellaland Commando was originally mobilised on 21 October 1899 to relieve Kuruman from British occupation in the Anglo Boer War.

By May 1900 however Vryburg was itself occupied by the British and the Stellaland Commando withdrew to form up with the Bloemhof Commando. Stellaland then became involved in a guerilla war and this resulted in the British policy of scorched earth in the region where many homesteads in and around Vryburg bore testimony to the onslaught.

During the guerilla phase of the Anglo Boer War, four members of the commando paid the highest price:
 Johannes Kuhn
 Hermanus Kuhn
 Johannes Jansen
 Hermanus Rautenbach

With the UDF
By 1902 all Commando remnants were under British military control and disarmed.

By 1912, however previous Commando members could join shooting associations.

By 1940, such commandos were under control of the National Reserve of Volunteers.

These commandos were formally reactivated by 1948.

With the SADF
During the Border War in South West Africa, the Stellaland Commando combined with commandos such as Kalahari, Bloemhof, Christiana, Schweizer-Reneke and De la Ray to form an operational company that was deployed to the Owamboland region.

The unit resorted under the command of the SADF's Group 21.

With the SANDF

Disbandment
This unit, along with all other Commando units was disbanded after a decision by South African President Thabo Mbeki to disband all Commando Units. The Commando system was phased out between 2003 and 2008 "because of the role it played in the apartheid era", according to the Minister of Safety and Security Charles Nqakula.

SADF era Unit Insignia

Leadership

References

See also 
 South African Commando System

Infantry regiments of South Africa
South African Commando Units